Meridel Le Sueur (February 22, 1900, Murray, Iowa – November 14, 1996, Hudson, Wisconsin) was an American writer associated with the proletarian literature movement of the 1930s and 1940s. Born as Meridel Wharton, she assumed the name of her mother's second husband, Arthur Le Sueur, the former Socialist mayor of Minot, North Dakota.

Life and career
Le Sueur, the daughter of William Winston Wharton and Marian "Mary Del" Lucy, was born into a family of social and political activists. Her grandfather was a supporter of the Protestant fundamentalist temperance movement, and she "grew up among the radical farmer and labor groups ... like the Populists, the Farmers' Alliance and the Wobblies, the Industrial Workers of the World." Le Sueur was heavily influenced by poems and stories that she heard from Native American women.

"After a year studying dance and physical fitness at the American College of Physical Education in Chicago, Illinois, Meridel moved to New York City, where she lived in an anarchist commune with Emma Goldman and studied at the American Academy of Dramatic Arts." Her acting career primarily took place in California, where she worked in Hollywood as an extra in The Perils of Pauline and Last of the Mohicans, as a stuntwoman in silent movies, and as a writer and journalist.

Starting in her late teens, she wrote for liberal newspapers about unemployment, migrant workers, and the Native American fight for autonomy. By 1925, she had become a member of the Communist Party.

Like other writers of the period such as John Steinbeck, Nelson Algren, and Jack Conroy, Le Sueur wrote about the struggles of the working class during the Great Depression. She published articles in the New Masses and The American Mercury. She wrote several popular children's books, including the biographies, Nancy Hanks of Wilderness Road, The Story of Davy Crockett, and The Story of Johnny Appleseed, and Sparrow Hawk, among others.

Her best known books are North Star Country (1945), a people's history of Minnesota, Salute to Spring, and the novel The Girl, which was written in the 1930s but not published until 1978.  In the 1950s, Le Sueur was blacklisted as a communist, but her reputation was revived in the 1970s, when she was hailed as a proto-feminist for her writings in support of women's rights. She also wrote on goddess spirituality in a poetry volume titled Rites of Ancient Ripening, which was illustrated by her daughter.

In the late 1940s and early 1950s, she taught writing classes in her mother's home on Dupont Avenue near Douglas Avenue in Minneapolis. She was something of a magnet for aspiring writers, drawing students from as far as New York City. She lived in the Twin Cities for some time.

During the 1960s, she traveled around the country, attending campus protests and conducting interviews.

In the 1970s, she spent much time living among the Navajo people in Arizona, returning to Minnesota in the summers to visit her growing extended family and friends. Late in her life, she lived with family in Minnesota.

"Women on the Breadlines" 
The short 1932 piece "Women on the Breadlines" is one of Le Sueur's most recognized proletarian works. Here, LeSueur wrote of the struggles that women faced during the Depression Era and how they were confined to limiting roles. While most of the characters presented in this work are struggling women searching for work, some are depicted as having nowhere to go but to "work in the streets." Through this and other works, Le Sueur opened the door for future female artists that wanted to write confrontational poetry, mediating the personal and the political.

Legacy 
She is commemorated in Minneapolis, Minnesota, in the Meridel Le Sueur building in the Cedar-Riverside neighborhood.

The song "Go" on the 1999 Indigo Girls album Come On Now Social  has a spoken passage inspired by Le Seur's "I Was Marching".

A play based on LeSueur's life, Hard Times Come Again No More, written by her friend Martha Boesing was performed at the Hennepin Center for the Arts' Illusion Theater in Minneapolis in 1994.

Selected works 
1930s The Girl, novel
1940 Salute to Spring, short stories 
1945 North Star Country, History of Minnesota.
1949 Nancy Hanks of Wilderness Road: A Story of Abraham Lincoln's Mother, children's book 
1951 Chanticleer of Wilderness Road: A Story of Davy Crockett, children's book
1954 The River Road: A Story of Abraham Lincoln, children's book 
1954 Little Brother of the Wilderness: The Story of Johnny Appleseed, children's book
1955 Crusaders: The Radical Legacy of Marian and Arthur LeSueur New York : Blue Heron Press,  
1973 Conquistadores
1974 Mound Builders
1975 Rites of Ancient Ripening, poems
1975 
1982 O.K. Baby
1984 I Hear Men Talking and Other Stories 
1984 
1985 
1987 Sparrow Hawk, children's book 
1991 
1990 
1993 Ripening: Selected Work, edited by Elaine Hedges, The Feminist Press.  
1992 
1997

Quotes 
"When the workers send for you, then you know you're really good. Sometimes they would send money to pay the bus fare."
"I tell the young writers who visit: 'Carry a notebook. That is the secret of a radical writer. Write it down as it is happening.'"

References

Further reading

External links 

Meridel Le Sueur in MNopedia, the Minnesota Encyclopedia 
The Meridel Le Sueur Official Website
  Meridel Le Sueur archive at the Minnesota Historical Society

 
Interview of Meridel Le Sueur by Robb Mitchell, Northern Lights TV Series #50 (1988):  [https://reflections.mndigital.org/catalog/p16022coll38:14#/kaltura_video] 

1900 births
1996 deaths
20th-century American novelists
American children's writers
American communists
American Marxists
American women novelists
Novelists from Minnesota
American women historians
American women essayists
American women children's writers
20th-century American women writers
Communist women writers
20th-century American historians
Proletarian literature
20th-century American essayists
Minnesota socialists
American Book Award winners
American socialist feminists
Historians from Minnesota
People from Clarke County, Iowa
Novelists from Iowa
Historians from Iowa
Activists from Minnesota
Activists from Iowa